Melissa Jon Seidemann (born June 26, 1990) is an American water polo player. She won the National Championship with Stanford University in 2011. She also won the gold medal with the United States national team in the 2012 Summer Olympics and 2016 Summer Olympics.

Career

High school
A 2008 graduate of College Park High School in Pleasant Hill, California, Seidemann competed on their water polo team all four years of high school, and competed for three years on the swim team. She also played soccer as a preparation. Seidemann captained the water polo team in 2007 and 2008, and helped lead her team to a DFAL title as a senior, then being named a NISCA All-American, and Team MVP in 2007. She then went on to be a member of the U.S. Youth National Team in 2006, which won the gold medal at the Pan-American Junior Games, being the leading scorer in the tournament with 20 goals. Seidemann was also a member of the Youth National Team, going  undefeated in Sydney, Australia  the summer of 2007. She was also on the team that competed in the 2008 Global Championships. Seidemann earned All-America honors at the U.S. Water Polo 20/U Nationals.

College
Seidemann joined the Stanford University women's water polo team in 2009. As a freshman, she led the team with 59 goals, scoring at least four goals in a game on five separate occasions. She led Stanford in scoring again the following year, and was nominated to the ACWPC All-America First Team in 2010. In 2011, Seidemann had her third-straight 50-goal season, finishing second on Stanford with 51 goals. She also scored a goal in the NCAA Championship title game, which then Stanford won.

Seidemann took a leave of absence from Stanford in 2012 so she could train with the U.S. national water polo team.

International
Seidemann first started playing for the U.S. national team in 2010. She scored three goals in that year's FINA World League Super Final and two goals in the FINA World Cup, helping the U.S. win both events.

The following year, the U.S. won the FINA World League Super Final again, with Seidemann scoring twice. She scored 11 goals in the Pan American Games, ranking third on the team, and the U.S. won the gold medal and qualified for the 2012 Summer Olympics. The U.S. went on to win gold at the Olympics as well.  She was also part of the 2016 US olympic team, winning her second Olympic gold medal that year.

Personal
Seidemann graduated Stanford University in 2013 with a degree in psychology. She has one older sister, Lauren, and a younger sister, Natalie. Lauren is the women's water polo head coach at College Park High School in Pleasant Hill, California, and Natalie is currently a center on the UC Irvine women's water polo team.

See also
 United States women's Olympic water polo team records and statistics
 List of Olympic champions in women's water polo
 List of Olympic medalists in water polo (women)
 List of world champions in women's water polo
 List of World Aquatics Championships medalists in water polo

References

External links
 
 

1990 births
Living people
American female water polo players
Water polo centre backs
Stanford Cardinal women's water polo players
People from Hoffman Estates, Illinois
Sportspeople from Illinois
Water polo players at the 2012 Summer Olympics
Water polo players at the 2016 Summer Olympics
Medalists at the 2012 Summer Olympics
Medalists at the 2016 Summer Olympics
Olympic gold medalists for the United States in water polo
World Aquatics Championships medalists in water polo
Water polo players at the 2015 Pan American Games
Water polo players at the 2019 Pan American Games
Pan American Games gold medalists for the United States
Pan American Games medalists in water polo
Medalists at the 2015 Pan American Games
Medalists at the 2019 Pan American Games
Water polo players at the 2020 Summer Olympics
Medalists at the 2020 Summer Olympics